Nucleus (: nuclei) is a Latin word for the seed inside a fruit. It most often refers to:

Atomic nucleus, the very dense central region of an atom 
Cell nucleus, a central organelle of a eukaryotic cell, containing most of the cell's DNA 

Nucleus may also refer to:

Science, technology, and mathematics

Astronomy
Active galactic nucleus in astronomy
Comet nucleus, the solid, central part of a comet

Biology
Cell nucleus, a central organelle of a eukaryotic cell, containing most of the cell's DNA 
Nucleus (neuroanatomy), a cluster of cell bodies of neurons in the central nervous system
Nucleus that forms in the eye in nuclear sclerosis (early cataracts)
Nucleus, a scientific journal concerned with the cell nucleus; published by Taylor & Francis
Nucleus, a small colony of honeybees, induced to raise a new queen by the beekeeper

Computer systems
 Nucleus (operating system), sometimes a synonym for kernel
 Nucleus CMS, a weblog system
 Nucleus RTOS, a real-time operating system (RTOS)
 Nucleus, part of an operating system loaded by an Initial Program Load or boot loader

Mathematics
Nucleus (algebra), the elements of a ring that associate with all others
 Nucleus (order theory), a mathematical term

Other sciences
Nucleus (syllable), in linguistics, the central part of a syllable
Atomic nucleus, the very dense central region of an atom
Condensation nucleus, the seed of a raindrop
Ice nucleus, the seed of a snowflake

Arts and media
 Nucleus (band), a jazz-rock band from Britain
 Nucleus (video game), a 2007 downloadable game on the PlayStation Store
 Nucleus (Anekdoten album), 1995
 Nucleus (Sonny Rollins album), 1975
 Nucleus, predecessor to Canadian rock band A Foot in Coldwater
 Nucleus, a scientific journal concerned with the cell nucleus; published by Taylor & Francis

Other uses
 Nucleus (advocacy group), a UK-European political advocacy campaign organisation
 Nucleus Limited, an Australian medical research company, taken over by Pacific Dunlop in 1988
 NuCLEus, a proposed 54-story mixed use building in Cleveland, Ohio, US
 Nucleus, the Nuclear and Caithness Archives, a British national archive

See also
Nuclear (disambiguation)
Nucleation
Nucleic acid
Nucleolus
Core (disambiguation)